Cercamoniinae is a subfamily within the extinct primate family Notharctidae primarily found in Europe, although a few genera have been found in North America and Africa.

Classification 
Family Notharctidae
Subfamily Cercamoniinae
Genus Agerinia
Genus Anchomomys
Genus Barnesia
Genus Buxella
Genus Donrussellia
Genus Mazateronodon
Genus Panobius
Genus Periconodon
Genus Pronycticebus
Genus Protoadapis

References

Literature cited

External links
Mikko's Phylogeny Archive

Prehistoric strepsirrhines
Eocene first appearances
Eocene extinctions